Tina Bursill (born 24 July 1951) is an Australian actress. She played Louise Carter on the television series Skyways (1979–1981) and Sonia Stevens on Prisoner (1983–1984). She played Meryl Knight in the Nine Network drama series Doctor Doctor.

Bursill won the AFI (AACTA) Award for Best Supporting Actress for the 1987 film Jilted.

Life and career
Tina Bursill was born on the 24 July 1951 in Sydney. Initially, she intended to pursue a career in anthropology, however, she set her sights on becoming an actress. She studied drama at the National Institute of Dramatic Art and graduated in 1971. Bursill started her career in musicals and stand-up comedy, before being cast in more serious roles in theatre.

Bursill made her acting debut in 1973 appearing in the lead role of short-lived comedy series The People Next Door as Meg Penrose. She was a regular character in daily soap opera The Unisexers which was launched in February 1975 on the Nine Network however the program's low ratings led to its cancellation and removal from broadcast after only three weeks. What followed was a number of guest appearances Australian television series, before receiving the role of Louise Carter in the Seven Network drama series Skyways, for which she appeared from 1979 to 1981. During which, she also had a recurring role on police drama series, King's Men between 1976 and 1980. In 1983, Bursill was cast in the role of Sonia Stevens on Network Ten's cult classic prison drama series Prisoner (Prisoner: Cell Block H), in which she was introduced in the fifth season as a devious vice queen imprisoned for heroin trafficking and remained in the series until 1984. Her role as Sonia Stevens is one she is most recognized for. The characters in which she plays are often that of sophisticated and coolly self-reliant women.

When Bursill departed the series, she appeared in several recurring roles; her first in A Country Practice as Bianca Forbes-Hamilton in 1981 and Cecily Day in 1985, Hey Dad..! as Det. Sgt. Anne Burke in 1987, and Heartbreak High in 1997 as Hilary Scheppers, the mother of characters Ryan and Anita Scheppers. She had appeared in Heartbreak High the year before as TV news reporter, Trish Ferro. She is perhaps also known for her recurring roles on the Seven Network soap opera Home and Away during the fourth season and fourteenth season in 1991 and 2001 as Lois Crawford and Stella Patterson respectively. Bursill most recently appeared in the recurring role of Kathy Carpenter in Neighbours during the thirtieth season in 2014.

Bursill made her feature film debut in 1975 when she was cast in The Great Macarthy, a sports comedy with John Jarratt and Barry Humphries. Her second film role came in 1984, when she appeared in Melvin, Son of Alvin, a sequel to the 1973 comedy, Alvin Purple. In 1987, she starred in Jilted, which earned her an Australian Film Institute Awards for Best Actress in a Supporting Role. Her further film credits include Afraid to Dance, Spider & Rose, Billy's Holiday, The Goddess of 1967, Son of the Mask, Three Blind Mice, Random 8, and Wish You Were Here.

In 2022 she was in a production of Cinderella.

Filmography

Film

Television

Film

Short films
 Entertaining Angels (1998)
 Cheek to Cheek (2000) - Julie
 Saturn's Return (2001) - Sheila
 Shuffle (2006) - Denise
 Pleasance (2007) - Biddy
 Bloody Henry (2013) - Jane (also makeup artist)
 Going Down (2015)

Theatre
 Theatre In Education (1971)
 Grease (1972)
 Great Banana Split (1972)
 Godspell (1972-1973)
 Scandals Of '74 (1974)
 The Jockey Club Stakes (1975)
 Son Of Naked Vicar (1975)
 The Big Bang Show (1976)
 Mothers And Fathers (1976)
 The Ripper Show (1976)
 Beyond Mozambique (1977-1978)
 2001 - A Postcode (1978)
 Zastrozzi (1982)
 Tom Foolery (1985)
 Rough Crossing (1986;1990)
 Manning Clark's History Of Australia - A Musical (1988)
 Top Silk (1989)
 On Golden Pond (1992)
 MacBeth (1992)
 The Sugar Mother (1993)
 Don't Dress For Dinner (1994)
 Blinded By The Sun (1998)
 23 Blooms On My Great Grandmothers Rosebush (1999)
 Up For Grabs (2001)
 Cinderella (2022)

Awards and nominations
 Australian Film Institute Awards for Best Actress in a Supporting Role – Jilted (1987)
 Equity Award for Most Outstanding Performance by an Ensemble in a Comedy Series – A Moody Christmas (2012)

References

External links
 

1951 births
Living people
Australian film actresses
Australian soap opera actresses
Australian television actresses
Best Supporting Actress AACTA Award winners
20th-century Australian actresses
21st-century Australian actresses